The Mysterious Beauty  is a 1922 Czechoslovak comedy film directed by Přemysl Pražský. The film was shot in Brno and had a premiere there a month later.

Cast
Vladimír Marek as Jaroslav Smola
Věra Skalská as Milada Smolová
Oldřich Nový as Petr Stamati
Jan Purkrábek as Ferdinand Veselý
Katy Fibingerová as Ludmila Veselá
Heda Marková as Máňa Vacková
Josef Žídek as Theodor Straka
Vlasta Bubelová as Straka's Wife
Přemysl Pražský as Director at Lloydfilm

References

External links 
 

1922 films
1922 comedy films
Czechoslovak black-and-white films
Czech silent films
Czech comedy films